Tritomegas bicolor, the pied shield bug, is a species of burrowing bug found in Europe. It is found across North Africa, Europe and Central Asia, although in the British Isles, it becomes rarer towards the north, and is absent from Scotland and Ireland. T. bicolor lives mainly on the ground, but is also visible on its host plants — chiefly Lamium (dead nettles) and Ballota nigra (black horehound).

References

Cydnidae
Hemiptera of Europe
Insects described in 1758
Articles containing video clips
Taxa named by Carl Linnaeus